The Very Best of Laura Branigan is a greatest hits album by American singer Laura Branigan, released solely in Europe on November 15, 1992. The album includes fifteen hits and a new 'Classic Summer Mix' of Branigan's biggest international hit "Self Control". An American greatest hits album, The Best of Branigan, was released three years later in 1995.

Track listing

Charts

Sales and certifications

References

1992 greatest hits albums
Albums produced by David Kershenbaum
Atlantic Records compilation albums
Laura Branigan albums